This is the list of newspapers in Armenia.

Daily newspapers
In Armenian:
301 (301 հայերեն, 301.am)
168 Zham (168 ժամ, 168 Hours)
Aravot (Առավոտ, "Morning"), published since 1994, liberal, independent 
Azg (Ազգ, "The Nation"), published since 1991
Hayastani Hanrapetutyun Հայաստանի Հանրապետություն, "The Armenian Republic"), government gazette, published since 1990
Haykakan Zhamanak (Հայկական Ժամանակ, "The Armenian Times"), liberal
Hayots Ashkharh (Հայոց Աշխարհ, "Armenian World")
Hraparak (Հրապարակ, "Square"), liberal
Irates (Իրատես, "Realist")
Iravunk (Իրավունք, "Right[s]")
Yerkir (Երկիր, "[The] Country"), published by the Armenian Revolutionary Federation, Social-Democrat
Past (Փաստ, Proof)
Zhamanak (Ժամանակ, "Time")
Zhoghovurd (Ժողովուրդ, "People")

In Russian:
Golos Armenii (in Russian Голос Армении, "Voice of Armenia") published in Russian since 1934
Novoe Vremya (in Russian Новое время) published in Russian

Online news agencies

301.am
1in.am
A1 Plus
Armenia
Armenia Diaspora
Armenia Hello
ArmeniaNow
Armenpress
Aysor
De Facto
EIN News
Eurasia Net
Fmgnews.info
Gamk
Groong
Hetq Online
Hye Media
Index Mundi
Lragir
Media
News
News Now
Oratert
PanARMENIAN.Net
Panorama
Tert.am
Topix

See also
Armenian newspapers for newspapers related to Armenia published outside Armenia
 Media of Armenia

Further reading
 
Newspapers List of Armenia

Armenian
 
Newspapers